Sergi Bruguera was the defending champion, but did not compete this year.

Wayne Ferreira won the title by defeating Jeff Tarango 6–0, 7–5 in the final.

Seeds

Draw

Finals

Top half

Bottom half

References

External links
 Official results archive (ATP)
 Official results archive (ITF)

1994 ATP Tour
ATP Bordeaux